Jacob Host (born 03 September 1996) is an Australian professional rugby league footballer who plays as a  forward for the South Sydney Rabbitohs in the NRL.

He previously played for the St. George Illawarra Dragons in the National Rugby League.

Background
Host was born in Padstow, New South Wales, Australia. 

He played his junior rugby league for Renown United, before being signed by the St. George Illawarra Dragons.

Host is also an avid video gamer and streams on Twitch as xhostyy.

Playing career

Early career
From 2014 to 2016, Host played for the St. George Illawarra Dragons' NYC team. On 25 July 2014, he re-signed with the Dragons on a 3-year contract. In November and December 2014, he played for the Australian Schoolboys.

2016
In round 9 of the 2016 NRL season, Host made his NRL debut for the Dragons against the New Zealand Warriors. In September, he was named on the interchange bench in the 2016 Intrust Super Premiership NSW Team of the Year. He was a member of the Illawarra Cutters side who won the 2016 Intrust Super Premiership NSW Grand Final. The following week he was part of the Cutters side which won the state championship match against Queensland Cup winners Burleigh Bears.

2017
Host made 11 appearances for St George in 2017 as the club went from sitting third on the table at the halfway mark of the season to end up finishing a disappointing ninth place missing the finals.  Between Rounds 13 and 26, the club only managed to win 4 games including a final round loss against the Canterbury-Bankstown Bulldogs where St George only needed to win the match to finish in eighth place and make the finals.

2018

Host managed to only make 5 appearances for St George in 2018 and mainly featured for the Intrust Super Premiership NSW side instead.

2019
Host made a total of 17 appearances for St George in the 2019 NRL season as the club finished second last on the table.

2020
Host scored his first try of the 2020 NRL season in round 16 during a 14-10 loss against the Gold Coast at Kogarah Oval.

In October 2020, Host signed a three-year contract with South Sydney.

2021
Host made his club debut for South Sydney in round 1 of the 2021 NRL season against Melbourne which Souths lost 26-18.  In round 8 against Canberra, he was sent to the sin bin for a professional foul in South Sydney's 34-20 victory.
Host played a total of 21 games for South Sydney in the 2021 NRL season including the club's 2021 NRL Grand Final defeat against Penrith.

2022
Host was limited to only eight appearances for South Sydney in the 2022 NRL season. Host did not feature in any of South Sydney's finals matches as they reached the preliminary final before losing to Penrith.

References

External links

South Sydney Rabbitohs profile
St. George Illawarra Dragons profile
Dragons profile

1996 births
Australian rugby league players
St. George Illawarra Dragons players
South Sydney Rabbitohs players
Illawarra Cutters players
Rugby league second-rows
Rugby league props
Rugby league locks
Living people
Rugby league players from Sydney